Marlton can refer to some locations in the United States:

 Marlton, Maryland, a census-designated place
 Marlton, New Jersey, a census-designated place
 Marlton, Camden, a neighborhood in Camden, New Jersey
Marlton Square, future medical facility 
 Marlton School, a school in Los Angeles for deaf and hard of hearing students